District Jail Jhelum is a prominent jail in Jhelum, Pakistan. It is one of the oldest jails in Pakistan which is used for prisoners of Jhelum and Chakwal.

See also
 Government of Punjab, Pakistan
 Punjab Prisons (Pakistan)
 Prison Officer
 Headquarter Jail
 National Academy for Prisons Administration
 Punjab Prisons Staff Training Institute

References

Prisons in Pakistan
Jhelum District